Tagiades flesus, the clouded flat, clouded forester or clouded skipper, is a butterfly of the family Hesperiidae from southern Africa.

Description
The wingspan is 35–47 mm for males and 43–49 mm for females. The upper surface of the wings is brownish with translucent spots near the apex of the forewings. These spots are larger in the female than in the male. The undersurface of the hindwings is white with a semicircle of irregular black spots. The winter form is lighter in colour than the summer form.

Distribution
This species is found in forest areas from the Eastern Cape of South Africa, through Eswatini and to the border of Zimbabwe.

Life cycle

Eggs

Single eggs are laid on the shoots of the food plants.

Larvae
The larvae feed on Dioscorea species (including D. malifolia) and Grewia species. The larva makes a shelter by cutting part way through a leaf from its edge and folding it over, or by sticking two leaves together with silk.

Pupae
The pupa is formed within the leaf shelter and is light brown in colour.

Adults
Adults are on wing year-round; in warmer areas with peaks in late summer and autumn. The males select territories and fly rapidly, with the white underside of the wings "flashing". The females fly randomly throughout the forest. The adults feed from flowers, including those of Deinbollia oblongifolia and Tabernaemontana ventricosa. These butterflies usually sit with the wings open.

References

Tagiades
Butterflies described in 1781